Judy Ongg (born 24 January 1950) is a Taiwanese-Japanese singer, actress, author, and woodblock-print artist. Born in Taipei, she graduated from Sophia University in Tokyo, Japan, and after which, she became a naturalized Japanese citizen. Her career has spanned more than four decades.

Biography 
Ongg made her film debut in the 1961 Japan-U.S. production The Big Wave, based on the Pearl S. Buck novel. She enjoyed great popularity in Chinese-speaking countries, and won the Best Actress honor at the ninth Taipei Golden Horse Film Festival. She later won the Special Prize at the 19th Asia Film Festival. She has recorded for Columbia Records, CBS Sony and Toshiba EMI. Her 1979 hit Miserarete sold two million copies. Ongg has had at least one song appear on the NHK program Minna no Uta, and has appeared on the New Year's Eve spectacular Kōhaku Uta Gassen with songs "Miserarete" in 1979 and "Reika no Yume" in 1980.  One of her most popular songs is "The Story of O-Shin", the Cantonese opening song for the hit drama, Oshin.

In television, Ongg took roles in contemporary dramas and jidaigeki, including Edo o Kiru. She has also appeared in several stage productions. Judy was offered the role of Mariko (Lady Toda Buntaro) in the television miniseries Shogun, but declined the part. It was eventually played by Yoko Shimada.

In 1999, Ongg organized and produced the "Heart Aid" charity concert at the Tokyo International Forum to raise money for survivors of the Chi-Chi earthquake in Taiwan. Her film credits run to nine titles; television dramas, 31; variety, 11; radio, 2; commercials, 7. Her music credits include over 40 singles and albums. Judy has written five books. Her prints have received numerous awards.

Filmography

Film
 Cyborg 009 (1966)
 Cyborg 009: Underground Duel (1967)
 Flying Phantom Ship (1969)
 Oiroke komikku (1970)
 Zu Mountain: New Legend of the Zu Mountain Swordsmen (1983)
 Robby the Rascal (1985)
 Tanba Tetsuro no daireikai shindara odoroita!! (1990)
 The Pillow Book (1996)
 Vampire Hunter D: Bloodlust (2000)
 American Pastime (2007)

Television series 
 The Big Wave (1961)
Oshizamurai Kiichihōgan (1973–74)
Shin Hissatsu Karakurinin (1977–78)
 Spirit Chaser Aisha (1986)
 Storm Riders (1988)
 Kaseifu ha mita! 19 (2001)
 Tweeny Witches (2003)
 Doctor-X Season 3 (2014)
 Zeni no Sensou (2015)

See also
Taiwanese art

References

External links 
 
 Judy Ongg Fan Site (unofficial) 
 

1950 births
Living people
Japanese women artists
Japanese film actresses
Japanese television actresses
Japanese voice actresses
Japanese women writers
Modern printmakers
Musicians from Taipei
Naturalized citizens of Japan
Sophia University alumni
Taiwanese emigrants to Japan
American School in Japan alumni
Japanese-language singers of Taiwan
Cantonese-language singers of Taiwan
Mandarin-language singers of Japan
20th-century Taiwanese women singers
20th-century Japanese actresses
21st-century Japanese actresses
20th-century Japanese women singers
20th-century Japanese singers
21st-century Japanese women singers
21st-century Japanese singers